Caladenia drummondii, commonly known as the winter spider orchid, is a species of orchid endemic to the south-west of Western Australia. It has a relatively small, hairy leaf at flowering and usually only one cream and deep purplish-red flower with downswept lateral sepals and petals.

Description 
The leaf is hairy, green on the upper surface and purplish beneath. The labellum is dark purplish-red with short, blunt teeth on the edges and its tip curving downwards and there are four or more rows of dark red calli along its centre line. Flowering occurs from late April to June.

Taxonomy and naming 
Caladenia drummondii was first described by George Bentham in 1873 in from a specimen collected by James Drummond near the Swan River. The description was published in Flora Australiensis. The specific epithet (drummondii) honours the collector of the type specimen, James Drummond.

Distribution and habitat 
The winter spider orchid is widespread between Lake King and Nerren Nerren station near Kalbarri. It grows in mallee communities, Melaleuca thickets and York gum woodland in the Avon Wheatbelt, Geraldton Sandplains, Mallee, Yalgoo biogeographic regions.

Conservation
Caladenia drummondii  is classified as "not threatened" by the Government of Western Australia Department of Parks and Wildlife.

References 

drummondii
Orchids of Western Australia
Endemic orchids of Australia
Plants described in 1873
Endemic flora of Western Australia